Tilanqiao (Shanghainese: dhilejhiao [dìlᴇ̋dʑiɔ᷆]) is a station on Line 12 of the Shanghai Metro, which opened on 29December 2013.

References

Railway stations in Shanghai
Line 12, Shanghai Metro
Shanghai Metro stations in Hongkou District
Railway stations in China opened in 2013